The Blues Brothers Show is a live show attraction located at Universal Studios Florida and formerly at Universal Studios Hollywood, based on the 1980 film The Blues Brothers.

The show debuted at the Florida theme park in March 1991 in the New York area, and features the title characters of Jake and Elwood Blues performing classic rock, blues and soul music from the film. Currently, in Florida, before the show begins, the Blues Brothers drive around the theme park in their Bluesmobile, park it nearby Transformers: The Ride 3D and then walk towards the stage.

Setlist
Five shows are performed daily on a rotating show schedule, which include a selection of the following:

Christmas show
During Universal Orlando's holiday season, the show is re-vamped to include a Christmas setlist.
"All I Want for Christmas Is You"
"Santa Claus Rock" (a version of "Jailhouse Rock")
"Run Rudolph Run"
"Blue Christmas"
"Snow Man" (a version of "Soul Man")
"Santa Claus Is Comin' to Town"

References

Universal Parks & Resorts attractions by name
The Blues Brothers
Amusement rides introduced in 1991
Universal Studios Florida
Musicals based on films
1991 musicals
Amusement park attractions based on film franchises